Julienne Bloch (11 August 1833 – 12 November 1868) was a French educator and writer. She was one of the earliest published Jewish women writers in France.

Biography
Bloch was the eldest daughter of Simon Bloch (1810–1879), founder and editor of the journal L'univers israélite. She received a teaching license at the age of sixteen, and devoted herself to Jewish education. For two years, when she was about twenty-five years of age, she directed the institution for young girls at Lyons, founded by the local Jewish community. Afterwards she co-directed the establishment of her sister Pauline Pereira in Paris.

From June 1854 to August 1861, Bloch published a series of articles in her father's paper under the title "Lettres d'une Parisienne." These articles provided complex analyses of French society, the role of women in Judaism, and the dangers of Jewish assimilation. In a series of letters to Eugène de Mirecourt, she criticized the writer's negative descriptions of well-known Jews.

She died of tuberculosis on 12 November 1868, at the age of 35.

References
 

1833 births
1868 deaths
19th-century French educators
19th-century women educators
Alsatian Jews
19th-century French Jews
Heads of schools in France
Jewish educators
Jewish women writers
People from Bas-Rhin
Tuberculosis deaths in France
19th-century deaths from tuberculosis